Basilica of the Immaculate Conception may refer to:

Benin 
Basilique de l'Immaculée Conception, Ouidah

Colombia 
Metropolitan Cathedral-Basilica of the Immaculate Conception, or Primatial Cathedral of Bogotá, Bogotá
Basilica of the Immaculate Conception (Jardín)
Metropolitan Cathedral Basilica of the Immaculate Conception, or Metropolitan Cathedral of Medellín, Medellín

Equatorial Guinea
Basilica of the Immaculate Conception, Mongomo

France 
Basilica of Our Lady of the Immaculate Conception, Lourdes

Mexico 
Minor Basilica and Metropolitan Cathedral of the Immaculate Conception, or Mazatlán Cathedral, Mazatlán, see list of Roman Catholic basilicas

Philippines 
Minor Basilica and Metropolitan Cathedral of the Immaculate Conception, or Manila Cathedral, Manila
Minor Basilica of Our Lady of Immaculate Conception, or Malolos Cathedral, Malolos, Bulacan
Minor Basilica of the Immaculate Conception (Batangas City)

Taiwan 
Basilica of the Immaculate Conception, or Wanchin Church, Wanchin

Saint Lucia 
Cathedral Basilica of the Immaculate Conception in Castries

Spain
Basilica of the Immaculate Conception (Barcelona)

United States 
Basilica of the Immaculate Conception (Waterbury, Connecticut)
Basilica of the Immaculate Conception (Jacksonville), Florida
Basilica of the Immaculate Conception (Natchitoches, Louisiana)
Basilica of Saint Mary of the Immaculate Conception (Norfolk, Virginia)
Basilica of the National Shrine of the Immaculate Conception, Washington, D.C.
Cathedral Basilica of the Immaculate Conception (Mobile, Alabama)
Cathedral Basilica of the Immaculate Conception (Denver), Colorado
Basilica of the Immaculate Conception, or Conception Abbey, Conception, Missouri

Vietnam 
Cathedral Basilica of Our Lady of The Immaculate Conception, or Notre-Dame Cathedral Basilica of Saigon, Ho Chi Minh City

See also
Cathedral of the Immaculate Conception (disambiguation)
Church of the Immaculate Conception (disambiguation)